The Badouel ray-triangle intersection algorithm, named after inventor Didier Badouel, is a fast method for calculating the intersection of a ray and a triangle in three dimensions without needing precomputation of the plane equation of the plane containing the triangle.

External links 
 Ray-Polygon Intersection An Efficient Ray-Polygon Intersection by Didier Badouel from Graphics Gems I

Geometry